Laetitia may refer to:

Mythology and religion
 Laetitia (goddess), a minor Roman goddess of gaiety
 One of the 16 geomantic figures, primary symbols used in divinatory geomancy

Other uses 
 Laetitia (given name)
 39 Laetitia, an asteroid
 "Laetitia", a song by the German music project E Nomine from the album Die Prophezeiung
 Laetitia, a French miniseries by Jean-Xavier de Lestrade

See also 
 Leticia (disambiguation)
 Letitia